Irene Byron Tuberculosis Sanatorium-Physician Residences, also known as the Kidder and Draper-Sherwood Houses, were two historic homes located in Perry Township, Allen County, Indiana.  They were designed by architect Charles R. Weatherhogg and built in 1934-1935 as housing for the medical director and head staff physician. Weatherhogg had earlier designed the sanatarium complex. The Kidder house was a two-story, Tudor Revival style frame dwelling with brick and stone cladding.  The Draper-Sherwood House was a two-story, Colonial Revival style frame dwelling with one-story side wings.  Surrounding the houses was a contributing formal landscape design.

It was listed on the National Register of Historic Places in 2004 and delisted in 2013.

References

Houses on the National Register of Historic Places in Indiana
Colonial Revival architecture in Indiana
Tudor Revival architecture in the United States
Houses completed in 1935
Houses in Fort Wayne, Indiana
National Register of Historic Places in Allen County, Indiana
Former National Register of Historic Places in Indiana